In Malta, The Leader of the Opposition (officially the Leader of the Opposition of Malta) is, by convention, the leader of the largest political party in the House of Representatives that is not in government. 

The Leader of the Opposition is appointed by the President of Malta, with the President making his or her decision based on the situation within the Maltese parliament. 

The Office is constitutional in nature and the Leader of Opposition is normally viewed as an alternative Prime Minister, and must be a member of the House of Representatives. The post did not exist in the period between 1933 and 1947 or the period between 1958 and 1962.

The current Leader of the Opposition is Bernard Grech, leader of the Nationalist Party, since 7 October 2020.

See also
 List of leaders of the opposition of Malta

References

Leaders of the Opposition
Malta